The Iberian chiffchaff (Phylloscopus ibericus) is a species of leaf warbler endemic to Portugal, Spain and North Africa, west of a line stretching roughly from the western Pyrenees via the mountains of central Spain to the Atlantic.

Taxonomy and etymology 
The name "chiffchaff" is onomatopoeic, referring to the repetitive chiff-chaff song of the common chiffchaff (Phylloscopus collybita). There are similar names in some other European languages, such as the Dutch Tjiftjaf, the German Zilpzalp and Welsh siff-saff.
 
The genus name Phylloscopus is from Ancient Greek phullon, "leaf", and skopos, "seeker" (from skopeo, "to watch"). The specific ibericus is Latin for "Iberian".

Previously the Iberian chiffchaff was considered as a subspecies of the common chiffchaff. As of 2016, it is recognised as a separate species under the name Phylloscopus ibericus for the following reasons (compared to the common chiffchaff):
 Brighter in colour
 Greener rump
 Yellower below
 Vocalisations different
 mtDNA sequence divergence

Due to current research on these species, it has been discovered that Iberian Chiffchaff is the most divergent among the members of the chiffchaff species complex. The Iberian Chiffchaff is slightly larger and paler, with more olive-colored plumage.

In past, erroneously listed as Phylloscopus brehmii.

References

Further reading
Svensson, Lars (2001). "The correct name of the Iberian Chiffchaff Phylloscopus ibericus Ticehurst 1937, its identification and new evidence of its winter grounds". Bulletin of the British Ornithologists' Club 121: 281–296.

External links
 Ageing and sexing (PDF; 1.8 MB) by Javier Blasco-Zumeta & Gerd-Michael Heinze

Iberian chiffchaff
Birds of Southern Europe
Birds of North Africa
Birds of West Africa
Fauna of the Iberian Peninsula
Iberian chiffchaff
Iberian chiffchaff